Jannuzzi is an Italian surname. Notable people with the surname include:

Lino Jannuzzi (born 1928), Italian journalist and politician
Luigi Jannuzzi (born 1952), American comedic playwright
Michele Jannuzzi, co-founder of design studio Jannuzzi Smith

Italian-language surnames